This is a list of yearly Evergreen Conference  football standings.

Evergreen Conference standings

Tri-Normal League (1920–1937)

Washington Intercollegiate Conference (1938–1947)

Evergreen Conference (1948–1984)

References

 

Evergreen Conference
Standings